Soluklu or Solook Loo or Solu Kalu may refer to:
 Soluklu, Ardabil
 Soluklu, Markazi
 Soluklu, West Azerbaijan